The 1957 Bowling Green Falcons football team was an American football team that represented Bowling Green State University in the Mid-American Conference (MAC) during the 1957 NCAA University Division football season. In their third season under head coach Doyt Perry, the Falcons compiled a 6–1–2 record (3–1–2 against MAC opponents), held seven of nine opponents to seven or fewer points, finished in second place in the MAC, and outscored all opponents by a combined total of 167 to 55.

The team's statistical leaders were Don Nehlen with 499 passing yards, Bob Ramlow with 492 rushing yards, and Ray Reese with 185 receiving yards. Linebacker Tim Murnen was the team captain; Murnen also received the team's Most Valuable Player award. The team tied a team record (set by the 1955 team) by allowing only eight touchdowns in the entire season.

Schedule

References

Bowling Green
Bowling Green Falcons football seasons
Bowling Green Falcons football